The Zaner-Bloser (also Zaner-Bloser Method) is a teaching script for handwriting based on Latin script as well as a system of penmanship instruction, which originated around 1904 at the Zanerian College of Penmanship in Columbus, Ohio. Charles P. Zaner (1864–1918) and Elmer W. Bloser (1865–1929), originally a Spencerian Method instructor, developed their teaching script with the aim of allowing learners an easier transition from print writing to cursive. The Zaner-Bloser Method  first teaches block letters and then cursive in order to enable written expression as quickly as possible and thus develop the ability to write. Material relating to the method of instruction practised by Zaner and Bloser is still being published by the Zaner-Bloser Company.

Characteristics
The Zaner-Bloser alphabet comprises two different sets of letters for handwriting – one for print writing (sometimes also called "manuscript printing"), and one for cursive writing. Zaner-Bloser letters are written straight up and down in print and slanted in cursive. In D'Nealian, for comparison, 13 letters change shape between print and cursive, and the slant does not change at all.

Development

A major factor contributing to the development of the Zaner-Bloser teaching script was Zaner's study of the body movements required to create the form of cursive letters when using the 'muscular arm method' of handwriting – such as the Palmer Method – which was prevalent in the United States from the late 19th century. The Palmer Method had been developed around 1888 as a simplification of the then-established Spencerian Method and had quickly become the most popular handwriting system in the US. 

Zaner considered the hinge action of the forearm as the 'central energy of movement' and that its relation to the direction of writing, or page angle, could affect letter form and the effort required. By changing from a page angle which placed letter down strokes on a line towards the center of the body, as other educators advised, Zaner offered a means to link muscle effort with balanced (medium), condensed (compact style), or extended (running hand) letter forms.

In most styles of cursive handwriting that existed in Zaner's time, the fingers used to support and steady the hand on the page for arm movement were fixed in relation to the pen (a typical instruction to writers according to the Palmer Method was that "the nails of the third and fourth fingers should rest lightly on the paper, and should follow the course of the pen in every direction"). In order to simplify the process of writing by hand, Zaner analysed how professional users of the then-existing handwriting styles used their 'rest' fingers to control movement. For writing lower case letters, Zaner recommended a technique of letting the little finger slide to the right in making up strokes, but to rest or drag for down strokes in order to improve control of the arm movement. This required the joints of the 'rest' fingers to act on the down strokes, independent of those holding the pen, which Zaner termed as 'hand action'. Zaner's studies and Bloser's contributions gave rise to a simplified ('streamlined') form of the script used in the Palmer Method.

Prevalence
By the mid-20th century, the Zaner-Bloser Method was the most popular style of penmanship instruction in the US, while interest in the Palmer Method had been declining from the 1950s. 

Use of the Zaner-Bloser Method declined after 1978, when the D'Nealian Method was introduced. The D'Nealian Method sought to further alleviate the difficulties of the transition from print writing to cursive writing by returning to a more cursive style based on the script of the Palmer Method with block letters that have many similarities with their cursive counterparts.

It has been claimed that close to 90% of US schoolchildren who follow the traditional print-then-cursive route to handwriting are taught either the Zaner-Bloser or the D'Nealian alphabet.

Publishing
In 1895, the Zanerian College of Penmanship in Columbus, Ohio, became known as the Zaner-Bloser Company, which continues to sells instruction materials for handwriting, reading, writing, spelling and vocabulary training.

See also
 Spencerian script, a US teaching script
 Palmer script, a US teaching script
 D'Nealian script, a US teaching script
 Getty-Dubay Italic script, a US teaching script
 BFH script, a US teaching script
 Regional handwriting variation

References

External links
 Zaner-Bloser Company official site

Penmanship
Latin-script calligraphy
Western calligraphy